The Buildings at 815–817 Brummel and 819–821 Brummel are two historic apartment buildings in Evanston, Illinois. Built in 1928 and 1927 respectively, the two three-story buildings have identical, mirrored Tudor Revival designs. Despite being identical, the buildings were designed by two different architects; 815–817 was designed by E.L. Kline, while 819–821 was designed by Kocher & Larson. Each building features a brick exterior with limestone detailing, Tudor arched entrances, double gables with a diamond pattern facing the street, and crenellation and a small tower on the courtyard-facing side. The two buildings encircle a shared open courtyard, causing them to resemble a single U-shaped courtyard apartment building; while such courtyard apartments are common in Evanston, the buildings are the only multi-building example of the design.

The buildings were added to the National Register of Historic Places on March 15, 1984.

References

Buildings and structures on the National Register of Historic Places in Cook County, Illinois
Residential buildings on the National Register of Historic Places in Illinois
Buildings and structures in Evanston, Illinois
Apartment buildings in Illinois
Tudor Revival architecture in Illinois
Residential buildings completed in 1927
Residential buildings completed in 1928